Korea Girl was an American indie rock band from San Jose, California.  The band's members included Elizabeth Yi on vocals and guitar, Tobin Mori on guitar, vocals, and keyboard, Summer on electric bass guitar and Marc Duarte on drums. The group received a Bammie (Bay Area Music Award) nomination in 1997 for Outstanding Independent Album. Che Chou later joined the band temporarily, but does not appear on any of the group's recordings. Scott Landucci later replaced Duarte on drums. Mori and Chou currently play in Ee.

The group was formed in January 1996 and broke up in 1999 due to conflicts between the two singers.  They released one CD (Korea Girl in 1997; rereleased in 1999 with additional bonus tracks) and one 7" (Reunion in 1997) on Asian Man Records, and also appear on various Asian Man compilation CDs as well as a video/DVD. Korea Girl was declared Album of the Year in 1997 by radio station KSCU. The group's name was presumably inspired by the fact that Yi is of Korean descent. The cover of their self-titled album depicts, in cartoon fashion, a schoolgirl carrying two revolvers.

Korea Girl's music was generally melodic and understated, featuring both male and female vocals and using clean and undistorted guitars in the manner of such earlier indie rock groups as Blake Babies.

Although cited as a San Jose band, the booklet to its Korea Girl CD lists Saratoga, California (a bedroom community near San Jose) as the band's mailing address.

References

External links
https://web.archive.org/web/20060712175545/http://www.eetheband.com/familytree/koreagirl/01.html

Musical groups established in 1996
Musical groups from San Jose, California
American people of Korean descent
Asian Man Records artists
Indie rock musical groups from California